The World Will Decide is the 14th studio album by Negativland, released on November13, 2020.

Recording and release
The release is part of a pair with 2019's True False and was promoted by the band with a Chrome browser extension. A deluxe limited of the album includes a screen print, bumper sticker, and digital download of No Brain, a live album recorded on the band's 2019 tour.

Track listing
"Unlawful Assembly"
"Content"
"Before I Ask"
"Why Are We Waiting"
"Create the Visitor"
"We Can Really Feel Like We're Here"
"More Data"– 5:46
"I Didn't Know I Was Dead"
"Failure"
"Don't Don't Get Freaked Out"– 4:28
"Anything Else"
"Attractive Target"
"Open Your Mouth"
"Incomprehensible Solution"
"The World Will Decide"

Personnel
Negativland
Ian Allen– composition, performance, production, recording, mixing, and editing
Peter Conheim– composition, performance, production, recording, mixing, and editing
Mark Hosler– composition, performance, production, recording, mixing, and editing
Don Joyce– composition, performance, production, recording, mixing, and editing
Jon Leidecker– composition, performance, production, recording, mixing, and editing
Richard Lyons– composition, performance, production, recording, mixing, and editing
David Wills– composition, vocals, performance, production, recording, mixing, and editing

Additional personnel
Kyle Bruckmann
Drew Daniel
Tom Dimuzio
Jem Doulton
Nava Dunkelman
Kristin Erickson
Steve Fisk
Matthew Hanson-Weller– screen print on deluxe edition
Erich Hubner
Dan Lynch– cover, label and booklet paintings
Ava Mendoza
Prairie Prince
M. C. Schmidt

References

External links

2020 albums
Negativland albums
Seeland Records albums